KTAN (1420 AM) is a radio station broadcasting a classic rock format. Licensed to Sierra Vista, Arizona, United States, the station serves the Southwestern Cochise County area. The station is currently owned by Townsquare Media and features programing from CBS Radio and Premiere Networks.

History
This station originally went on the air on July 30, 1957 as a daytime-only station with a power of 1,000 watts, using the call letters KHFH (Historic Fort Huachuca). This station was the first radio station in Sierra Vista and the third radio station in Cochise County. The first, KSUN in Bisbee, (now defunct) went on the air in 1933, and the second, KAWT (later KDAP) in Douglas, came to air in 1947. All three stations were owned by Carleton Morris and KHFH was the most powerful of the three. The studio was located at the intersection of Carmichael Avenue and DePalma St. (now 700 Carmichael Ave.) and the transmitter was located in an undeveloped area in the southeast part of town, now 2300 Busby Drive. In August 1958, the license holder requested permission from the FCC to operate at night for one night only in order to broadcast election result; the FCC denied the request. The station was finally granted nighttime operations on September 5, 1962 with a power of 500 watts with a directional pattern. At the same time that nighttime operations began, the studios were relocated to the transmitter site.

KHFH was the only radio station in a small town adjacent to a military base (Ft. Huachuca), so they used to broadcast a variety of programming to suit everyone's preferences. They broadcast a "middle of the road"  format the morning, country/western in the afternoon, top 40/rock and roll at night and classical on Sunday evenings. Due to a significant number of German speaking people in the area, the station also broadcast one hour a week of programming in German, both music and talk; even the commercials were in the German language. In addition to the variety of musical formats, they also broadcast the local high school football, basketball and baseball games, both home and away, along with local news several times a day. Huachuca Broadcasting Company became the licensee in 1966 in the wake of Carleton Morris's 1962 death.

The call letters were changed to KTAN in September 1973 when a sister station was added, KTAN-FM 100.9 (now co-owned KZMK). The KTAN callsign had previously been used at 580 AM in Tucson between 1959 and 1967, and before that, it had been in use in Sherman, Texas. The FM station then broadcast a top 40/rock and roll format while the AM station broadcast a "middle of the road" format. The country/western and classical formats were dropped, but the local news and local high school sports broadcasts remained. KTAN changed to a country/western format from 1979 to 1998, which persisted under four different owners. From 1998 to 1999, it broadcast a contemporary Christian format. In 1999, KTAN switched to a news/talk format, that became popular with AM stations in the 1990s. They aired popular conservative talk shows plus some local talk shows. Cherry Creek Radio acquired the station from Commonwealth Broadcasting in 2003. In July 2015, KTAN switched their programing to classic country/western. This was done because of declining advertising revenues. Local advertisers were becoming leery of having their business name associated with controversial topics and programs.

On June 6, 2019, KTAN changed their format from classic country to classic rock, branded as "Thunder 98.1" (simulcast on FM translator K251CQ 98.1 FM Sierra Vista).

References

External links

 
 
 

TAN
Radio stations established in 1957
1957 establishments in Arizona
Classic rock radio stations in the United States
Townsquare Media radio stations